Priya Kanungo is an Indian Hindustani classical vocalist.

References

Hindustani singers
Living people